Established in 1990, the Ministry of Justice of Namibia provides court representation to ministries, offices, agencies, the master of the High Court, the speaker of the National Assembly, the prosecutor-general, magistrates, the Motor Vehicle Accident Fund, regional councils, recognized traditional authorities, and entities associated with the government administration. In 1995, the Ministry of Justice merged with the Attorney General's Office.

Ministers 

 Ngarikutuke Tjiriange (1990-2003)
 Albert Kawana (2003-2004)
 Pendukeni Iivula-Ithana (2005-2012)
 Utoni Nujoma (2012-2015)
 Albert Kawana (2015-2018)
 Sacky Shanghala (2018-2020)
 Yvonne Dausab (2020-present)

See also 

 Attorney General of Namibia
 Politics of Namibia

References 

Justice ministries

Government of Namibia
1990 establishments in Namibia